is one of syllable in Javanese script that represent the sound /ɲɔ/, /ɲa/. It is transliterated to Latin as "nya", and sometimes in Indonesian orthography as "nyo".

Pasangan 
Its pasangan form , is located on the bottom side of the previous syllable. For example,  - anak nyamuk (little mosquito).

Murda 
The letter ꦚ has a murda form, which is ꦘ.

Glyphs

Unicode block 

Javanese script was added to the Unicode Standard in October, 2009 with the release of version 5.2.

See also
 Ña (Indic)

References 

Javanese script